Nocardia transvalensis is a species of bacteria from the genus Nocardia that is known to cause nocardiosis.

References

Mycobacteriales
Bacteria described in 1927